List of the  National Register of Historic Places listings in Oneida County, New York

This is intended to be a complete list of properties and districts listed on the National Register of Historic Places in Oneida County, New York.  The locations of National Register properties and districts (at least for all showing latitude and longitude coordinates below) may be seen in a map by clicking on "Map of all coordinates". Seven of the properties are further designated National Historic Landmarks.



Listings county-wide

|}

See also

National Register of Historic Places listings in New York

References

Oneida County
Oneida County, New York